Espace Bernadette Soubirous Nevers is a former convent and the motherhouse of the Sisters of Charity of Nevers in Nevers, France, and is where the body of Saint Bernadette reposes. In 1970, it was converted into a sanctuary run by volunteers and a few sisters who administer to pilgrims and manage the building.

History
In 1853, Dominique-Augustin Dufêtre, bishop of Nevers, assigned the Church of Saint Lupus and Saint Gildard in Nevers to be rebuilt as a religious house for the Sisters of Charity of Nevers. By that time, not much was left but a rectangular building; the remains of the thirteenth-century building were used to build the Saint Gildard Convent, which was officially consecrated on 15 July 1856. This is the motherhouse of the Sisters of Charity of Nevers, where in 1866 Bernadette of Lourdes entered to do her novitiate and where she died in 1879. Her body was buried on the convent grounds, in a special crypt, separate from the graves of the other sisters. 

In 1970, the convent was changed into a sanctuary site and now the rooms are used as hotel rooms. The chapel was also significantly transformed, changing from a Tridentine altar into a plain Novus ordo altar, and the tabernacle was also moved to a side altar. Saint Bernadette's body lies to the right of the main altar in a glass reliquary.

Interior
The convent was transformed into a sanctuary, which significantly changed the interior setting. The rooms that the Sisters would use were changed into lodging rooms for pilgrims. The cloister, with huge glass windows, overlooks the flowerbeds.  Its sunlit corridors lead to lounges, reading rooms, conference rooms and dining rooms. Located in a unique setting in the town centre, Espace Bernadette provides sleeping accommodation for up to 200 people. Bedrooms are located on the first and second floors. The novitiate room was converted into a chapel room. It is here that in July 1866, wearing her Pyrenean costume, Bernadette told the story of the apparitions for the last time to 300 Sisters. The infirmary, where Bernadette died at the age of 35, is now Holy Cross Oratory.  During her thirteen years at Saint Gildard, she served as assistant-nurse, head-nurse and sacristan during which time she was often ill. Espace Bernadette also offers multi-purpose rooms with professional equipment for up to 250 people. Additionally, food is served in the dining rooms seven days a week, where up to 200 people can be catered for daily.

Museum
In 1958, the Sisters of Charity had a museum built to teach pilgrims about the life of Saint Bernadette, in particular her sufferings. The museum highlights the various steps in Bernadette’s life: the  cachot, the grotto, Hospice of Lourdes and her time in Nevers.  Some photographs and artefacts depict her daily life.

Bernadette's Chapel
Bernadette’s body, when exhumed for the process of beatification, was found to be intact, to the surprise of those present.

Since 3 August 1925, following her beatification, Bernadette’s body lies in a glass shrine in the chapel of the convent of Saint- Gildard in Nevers.

Built on the ruins of Saint Gildard’s Abbey, this simple and bright chapel was consecrated in 1856 when the community of the Sisters of Charity of Nevers moved into this new building, and changed its name from Saint Gildard to Bernadette's chapel when the convent was turned into a sanctuary.

Grotto

The grotto was created in 1884, five years after the death of Bernadette, demanded by Marie Therese Vauzou, the mother superior of the convent who also served as the mistress of novices during Bernadette's novitiate. It was constructed to resemble the grotto in Lourdes, and a piece of rock that the Virgin Mary stood on was taken from the grotto of Massabielle and attached to the replica grotto in Nevers. The grotto also offers candles that can  be bought and lit in the grotto which feature a picture of Bernadette on them.

Saint Joseph's Chapel
Bernadette Soubirous died on 16 April 1879 and was interred in Saint Joseph's chapel for 40 years.  The chapel is located in the middle of the sanctuary gardens, at the end of an avenue lined with beautiful lime trees. The chapel surprisingly contains a Tridentine altar, which contrasts with the significant transformation that took place in the former convent's chapel. A stained flag image of Our Lady of Lourdes shines above the altar. Nearby is also the statue of Our Lady of the Waters. The paths which cross the large gardens lead to this statue in front of which Bernadette chose to pray. She used to say:  "It is she who reminds me most of the Lady I saw."

References

1856 establishments in France
Religious buildings and structures completed in 1856
Christian buildings and structures in France
Convents of the Catholic Church in Europe
Convents in France
Nevers
Sisters of Charity of Nevers